Jeffrey 'Jeff' A Snodin (born 1965), is a male former cyclist who competed for England.

Athletics career
Snodin was a seven times National Champion at various levels.

He represented England in the 10 mile scratch race event, at the 1994 Commonwealth Games in Victoria, British Columbia, Canada.

References

1965 births
Living people
English male cyclists
Cyclists at the 1994 Commonwealth Games
Commonwealth Games competitors for England